Uecker may refer to:

 Uecker, a river in Germany
 a surname: 
Bob Uecker (born 1934), American baseball player and commentator
Georg Uecker (born 1962), German actor
Günther Uecker (born 1930), modern German artist

See also
 Euchre

Surnames of German origin